Credit Benchmark (“CB”) is a privately owned financial data analytics company founded in 2012 by Donal Smith and Mark Faulkner. It provides Credit Consensus Ratings and Analytics based on the contributed risk views of major global financial institutions. The internal risk views of these institutions are collected, aggregated and anonymized to create a Credit Consensus on tens of thousands of corporate, financial, fund and sovereign entities globally.

The company is headquartered in London, UK, with offices in New York City, and services a global client base of banks, insurance and reinsurance companies, asset managers, CCPs and other firms. Credit Benchmark has been releasing Credit Consensus data since May 2015.

Credit Benchmark was recognised in the FinTech50 awards in 2015, 2016 and 2017 and now sits in the FinTech50 Hall of Fame. The company supports several ESG initiatives including #10,000 Black Interns, Living Wage Employers, and ClientEarth.

History

Credit Benchmark was founded in 2012 by Donal Smith and Mark Faulkner, both previously of Data Explorers. It completed a $7million Series A funding round in 2014, led by Index Ventures; a $20million Series B funding round in 2015, led by Balderton Capital; and a $7million funding round in 2018 led by Index Ventures, Balderton Capital, Communitas Capital and a group of private investors including ex-Goldman Sachs International CEO, Michael Sherwood.

The company began collecting Probability of Default (PD) and forward-looking senior unsecured Loss Given Default (LGD) data from several Internal Ratings Based ("IRB") banks in 2014. The first Credit Consensus data release was in May 2015 and has continued on a monthly and subsequently a twice monthly basis since.

In 2019, Credit Benchmark announced the formation of an Advisory Board, chaired by ex-Goldman Sachs CRO, Craig Broderick. The data was also added to the FactSet Marketplace that year.

In 2020, Credit Benchmark supplied the Bank of England access to the CB dataset to help process COVID Corporate Financing Facility ("CCFF") applications. Later that year, partnerships were announced with the Global Peer Financing Association ("GPFA") and IHS Markit. Credit Benchmark’s dataset was also launched on the Bloomberg Terminal and enterprise service in November 2020.

Credit Benchmark joined the World Economic Forum’s Global Innovators Community in 2022.

Products and Services
Credit Benchmark offers a subscription-based data service to a global client base of banks, insurance and reinsurance companies, asset managers, CCPs and other firms.

The dataset includes 60,000+ entity-level Credit Consensus Ratings and Analytics supplemented by descriptive analytics that provide insights into the underlying credit views that make up the Consensus including range and standard deviation.

Also available are macro-level Aggregate Analytics that offer the ability to compare credit trends and distributions across 120 countries, 300 industries and 75 sectors.

The data and analytics offered allow users to conduct portfolio alerting and monitoring; benchmarking (including scale modelling, entity-level outliers and portfolio), bespoke reporting and analysis including C-Suite level reporting, and peer analysis.

The data is available via the Credit Benchmark Web App, Excel add-in, API, flat file download, and third-party platforms including Bloomberg and IHS Markit.

Methodology, Technology & Information Security 
Credit Benchmark’s proprietary data platform combines the views of expert analysts, representing the interests of 40+ global institutions with real world risk exposure. These views are then aggregated and analysed in a secure, anonymized and compliant environment, providing insight into the risk activity of the world’s leading financial institutions.

The data collected from contributors is a specific measure of credit risk: a one-year, forward-looking Probability of Default ("PD") and forward-looking senior unsecured Loss Given Default ("LGD"). The underlying contributions are derived from models that are approved by regulatory authorities.

The submitted risk observations are processed through a sophisticated purpose-built mapping engine, using data inputs from leading reference data providers and public sources including the Securities Exchange Commission (SEC) and Global Legal Entity Identifiers (LEI), and supported by a dedicated team of +25 members of staff. 

The data cleansing process is intended to identify errors in mapping or in reported data values. Data validation identifies exceptions and outliers based on a growing set of filtering rules.

After being anonymized and aggregated, the contributed risk estimates are published twice-monthly in the form of Credit Consensus Ratings (“CCRs”) and Aggregate Analytics, providing an independent and unique measure of credit quality.

Credit Benchmark exercises bank-grade security at its office site with a physical separation of the data room. It uses two separate technical environments; a secure data processing environment hosted by CenturyLink (and ISO27001 and SOC1 datacentre) and the Credit Benchmark enterprise environment. The company undergoes twice annual penetration testing by independent third parties and all client data is encrypted at rest and in transit.

References

External links
 Credit Benchmark Homepage

Financial services companies established in 2012
Financial services companies of the United Kingdom
Financial data vendors
2012 establishments in the United Kingdom
British companies established in 2012
Financial data analysis
Privately held companies based in London